Oh, No!  Not THEM! was an untelevised 1990 television pilot for an American television series remake of the British television show The Young Ones, commissioned by the Fox network.

It starred Nigel Planer as Neil (reprising his Young Ones role) and Jackie Earle Haley, It was directed and produced by David Mirkin and featured an animated opening credit sequence set to "Tomorrow Never Knows" by The Beatles. Fox did not pick up the series.

Robert Llewellyn wrote in his book The Man in the Rubber Mask (1994):

Aside from the title sequence, no footage, images, or audio from the pilot have resurfaced in any form, and the majority of its elements remain a mystery.

References

External links

Television pilots not picked up as a series
Unaired television pilots
1990 American television episodes
1990 in American television
American television series based on British television series
The Young Ones (TV series)